Salteado (Spanish for "jumped") may refer to:
Corrido (Spain), genre of traditional music and dance
Sautéing, cooking technique

See also
Saltado